The 1982–83 Winnipeg Jets season was the 11th season of the Winnipeg Jets, their fourth season in the National Hockey League.

Offseason
After a very successful 1981-82 season, in which the club made the playoffs for the first time since joining the NHL in 1979, the Jets had a quiet off-season.  With the Colorado Rockies moving to East Rutherford, New Jersey and becoming the New Jersey Devils, the NHL underwent realignment, and the Jets were shifted from the Norris Division back to the Smythe Division, where the team spent their first two seasons from 1979 to 1981.  Winnipeg joined the Calgary Flames, Edmonton Oilers, Los Angeles Kings and Vancouver Canucks to form the five team division.

On May 9, 1982, the team signed undrafted free agent goaltender Brian Hayward, who had spent the past four seasons with the Cornell Big Red, going 42-27-2 with a 3.88 GAA in his time with the team.  On June 9, 1982, the Jets participated in the 1982 NHL Entry Draft, and with the 12th overall pick in the draft, the team picked defenseman Jim Kyte from the Cornwall Royals of the OHL.  Kyte, a big, stay-at-home defenseman, had four goals and 17 points in 52 games in his rookie season with Cornwall in 1981-82.

Regular season

Final standings

Schedule and results

Playoffs

The Jets faced the Smythe Division champion Edmonton Oilers in the Division semi-finals.  The Oilers swept the Jets in three games.

Transactions

Trades

Waivers

Free agents

Draft picks
Winnipeg selected the following players at the 1982 NHL Entry Draft, which was held at the Montreal Forum in Montreal, Quebec on June 9, 1982.

NHL Amateur Draft

Farm teams
Sherbrooke Jets

See also
1982–83 NHL season

References

External links

Winnipeg Jets season, 1982-83
Winnipeg Jets (1972–1996) seasons
Winn